Eva Vítečková (born 26 January 1982) is a Czech basketball player who competed in the 2004 Summer Olympics, the 2008 Summer Olympics and the 2012 Summer Olympics.

References

1982 births
Living people
Czech women's basketball players
Olympic basketball players of the Czech Republic
Basketball players at the 2004 Summer Olympics
Basketball players at the 2008 Summer Olympics
Basketball players at the 2012 Summer Olympics
People from Žďár nad Sázavou
Power forwards (basketball)
Sportspeople from the Vysočina Region